
Year 692 (DCXCII) was a leap year starting on Monday (link will display the full calendar) of the Julian calendar. The denomination 692 for this year has been used since the early medieval period, when the Anno Domini calendar era became the prevalent method in Europe for naming years.

Events 
 By place 

 Byzantine Empire 
 Battle of Sebastopolis: The Byzantine army under Leontios is defeated at Sebastopolis, (modern Turkey) by Arab forces led by Muhammad ibn Marwan. During the battle, a "special military corps" (some 20,000 Slavs) under Neboulos deserts the Byzantine lines, and goes over to the Muslim Arabs. 
 Arab–Byzantine War: Muslims conquer Armenia, Iberia and Colchis, the last remaining Byzantine holdings east of the Taurus Mountains. Emperor Justinian II is forced to agree to joint Byzantine-Arab control of Cyprus, in the Eastern Mediterranean Sea (approximate date).

 Britain 
 King Ine of Wessex installs his kinsman, Nothelm, as ruler of Sussex. According to Bede, Sussex is subjected to Ine for a number of years.

 Asia 
 Empress Wu Zetian regains control of the Kingdom of Khotan in the Tarim Basin (Northwest China).

 Mesoamerica 
 The Temple of the Cross at Palenque (Mexico) is constructed to commemorate the rise of King K'inich Kan B'alam II to the throne (approximate date).

 By topic 

 Religion 
 The Quinisext Council is held in Constantinople; it lays the foundation for the Orthodox canon law. Justinian II suppresses non-Orthodox religious practices, and orders the arrest of Pope Sergius I; the militias of Rome and the Exarchate of Ravenna refuse, and take the pope's side.

Births 
 Gundelina, Frankish abbess

Deaths 
 Abd-Allah ibn al-Zubayr, Arab sahabi (b. 624)
 Asmā' bint Abi Bakr, companion of Muhammad
 B'alaj Chan K'awiil, a Maya ruler of Dos Pilas (b. 625)
 Two Ewalds, Saxon priests (approximate date)
 Chrothildis, Frankish queen regent

References

Sources